The 2012–13 season is F.C. Motagua's 62nd season in existence and the club's 47th consecutive season in the top fight of Honduran football. The domestic league will be divided into two tournaments, Apertura and Clausura. The Apertura was scheduled to be played in the second half of 2012, while the Clausura in the first half of 2013. Motagua will be looking for its 13th domestic championship. Due to an unsuccessful 2011–12 season, the club won't have international participation.

Overview
The Apertura tournament was played from August to December 2012.  On 8 May 2011, the fitness coach Juan Bertani announced his departure from the club, one day earlier José Treviño was confirmed as manager for the third consecutive tournament. The first player to sign for the club was César Oseguera who played as midfielder for Atlético Choloma last season. One day later on 10 May, Brazilian forward Jocimar Nascimento returned to the Eagles, Jocimar was a key player for the club from 2006–2009. On the same day, midfielder Abner Méndez joined from C.D.S. Vida.

On 14 May, Motagua acquired 21-year-old forward Eddie Hernández who had a fleeting passage on Sweden with BK Häcken; Hernández is also part of the U-23 national team that will play at the 2012 Summer Olympics. The first player to left the team was Sergio Mendoza on 12 May; Julio de León was also released on 15 May. Roger Mondragón joined Vida on loan, as well as Adán Ramírez who was loaned to C.D. Real Sociedad. After 3 tournaments and one goalscorer award with the blues, Jerry Bengtson signed a 4-year agreement with MLS club New England Revolution.

On 4 July, the league announced the fixtures for the Apertura tournament, Motagua faced C.D. Victoria on round one and lost 1–2, the game was played at Estadio San Jorge in Olanchito due to repairs on Estadio Nilmo Edwards.

On 20 October, Motagua lost the Honduran Superclásico against archrivals C.D. Olimpia 0–2; three days later, manager José Treviño was sacked due to poor results. Former defender Reynaldo Clavasquín took over the club. With Clavasquín as manager, Motagua was able to lift its performance considerable and qualified to the playoffs as thirds.

On the second round, Motagua overcame easily over Real C.D. España with a convincing 7–3 aggregate score. On the semifinals, the team wasn't so lucky and were eliminated by C.D. Victoria after a 3–3 aggregate score, result that was not enough due to a lower finish in the regular season.

The Clausura tournament was played from January to May 2013.  The club's preseason started on 10 December 2012. Motagua announced that some home games will be played at other venues; their first Clausura game was played at Estadio Fausto Flores Lagos in Choluteca and ended with an unexpected 0–1 defeat against C.D. Real Sociedad.  On 10 March 2013, the club's staff hired former manager Juan de Dios Castillo replacing José Clavasquín.  The poor results were constant throughout the entire tournament, which resulted in another early elimination in the regular season.

Players

Transfers in

Transfers out

Squad
 Statistics as of 20 April 2013
 Only league matches into account

Results

Preseason and friendlies

Apertura

Clausura

Statistics
 As of 20 April 2013

References

External links
Motagua Official Website

F.C. Motagua seasons
Motagua
Motagua